The Used is the debut studio album by the American rock band The Used, released on June 25, 2002, through Reprise Records The album has been certified platinum by the RIAA in 2019.

Background
Jeph Howard and Branden Steineckert played in a local act that performed shows with another band, which featured Bert McCracken. The former band soon broke up; Howard, Steineckert and Quinn Allman formed a new band, Dumb Luck in October 1999. Shortly afterwards, the group split up. The Used formed in January 2001 with Allman on guitar, Howard on bass and Steineckert on drums. The trio, who were in need of a vocalist, held many fruitless auditions. According to Howard, they "remembered [about McCracken] and called him. After that, everything just fell into place."

Following a period of homelessness, the group recorded a demo release, Demos from the Basement. Allman said the group listened back to the demos "over and over, getting stoked talking about what we wanted to do with them". The group eventually gave a copy to John Feldmann of Goldfinger, "but he would tell us they totally sucked", Allman added. The band subsequently honed their sound before Feldmann flew the group out to Los Angeles, where they played label showcases without any success initially. However, they soon began to receive offers from record companies. Soon afterwards, the group signed to major label Reprise Records in late 2001. McCracken said the label staff "really seemed to get what we're about ... offer[ing] us 100% creative and artistic freedom".

Production and composition
The Used was recorded at Foxy Studios in Marina del Rey, California with Feldmann as the producer. The group recorded piano parts in London at Olympic Studios. Feldmann acted as an engineer with assistance from Mark Blewett and Donny Campion. Feldmann contributed backing vocals to "Bulimic" and "Greener with the Scenery", the latter of which also included additional backing vocals from Carmen Daye. String arrangements on "Greener with the Scenery" and "On My Own" were done by Nick Ingman. Feldmann mixed the recordings, while Joe Gastwirt mastered them at Ocean View Digital Mastering. Steineckert said that "[the] one thing we all took from [working with Feldmann] ... [was] to not lose yourself through everything".

The album's sound has been described as screamo, emo and post-hardcore. "The Taste of Ink" is "pretty much about being frustrated and maybe biting on a pen", according to McCracken. McCracken said "Buried Myself Alive" was "about a girl. It's about drugs. It's about loss. It's about being alive, about living". "A Box Full of Sharp Objects" was inspired in part by McCracken's past experiences with drugs. He said it was about "drugs and alcohol and loss and love ... and just being stoked that things are always going to get better or always gonna get worse and that's such a great thing". "Blue and Yellow" is about McCracken and Allman's friendship, as the latter explains: "When the band started to really pick up ... we were almost not being friends anymore because we were focusing so much time on the band and not on each other".

Release
The Used was released on June 25, 2002 through Reprise Records. During the summer, the group performed on the Warped Tour and Ozzfest touring festivals. Despite never having been released as a single, "A Box Full of Sharp Objects" received airplay starting in July, and a band-directed music video was in rotation at TV stations. In late August, a music video was filmed for "The Taste of Ink". In October and November, the band supported Box Car Racer on their headlining tour of the US. In early December, the band performed at KROQ-FM's Almost Acoustic Christmas festival. In January 2003, the band went on a headlining West Coast tour of the US with support from Taking Back Sunday, New Transit Direction and the Blood Brothers. "Buried Myself Alive" was released to radio on January 28. The following day, the band posted the music video to the song on their website. The video was directed by Ami & Kinkski, and features McCracken "play[ing] with fire while the band wreaks havoc", according to Kludge.

The Used embarked on a headlining tour of the US East Coast in February 2003 with support from Finch, the Movielife and My Chemical Romance. This was followed by a co-headlining US with Finch, with support from Steel Train and From Autumn to Ashes. "The Taste of Ink" was released as a single on March 11. In March and April, the band went on tour with Coheed and Cambria. In April and May, the group went on tour with Thrice. Two of these shows formed part of MTV's Campus Invasion tour. "Blue and Yellow" was released to radio on May 19. From June to August, the group performed at Warped Tour. In July, the group released a CD/DVD album, Maybe Memories. The CD included live versions of "Maybe Memories", "Say Days Ago", "A Box Full of Sharp Objects" and "On My Own", Japanese-exclusive bonus track "Just a Little", a demo of "Bulimic", and "Sometimes I Just Go for It", a track that had been recorded during the piano sessions in London.

Reception

Upon its release, the album received positive reviews from critics, with praise being directed primarily to the instrumentation.

Legacy
The album has since become recognized as a landmark album of the emocore and screamo genres. Many bands such as Escape the Fate, Crown the Empire and A Static Lullaby have cited the album as a major influence on their sounds. NME listed the album as one of "20 Emo Albums That Have Resolutely Stood The Test Of Time". Journalists Leslie Simon and Trevor Kelley included the album in their list of the most essential emo releases in their book Everybody Hurts: An Essential Guide to Emo Culture (2007). Alternative Press ranked "A Box Full of Sharp Objects" at number 45 and "The Taste of Ink" at number 21 on their list of the best 100 singles from the 2000s. Tom Weaver of Casey has expressed admiration for the album.

Commercial performance
The Used debuted at number 50 on the Billboard Heatseekers Albums chart in the August 17 issue. It later rose to number one in the November 16 issue and gained "Heatseekers Impact" status when the release moved from number 106 to number 96 on the Billboard 200 chart. It eventually peaked at number 63 on the chart. Reprise Records' marketing director Xavier Ramos said the label's market strategy for the group was to let their fan base build through touring. He said, "We put them on the road soon after we signed them. Our philosophy was that this is a good live band, and they'll win fans over show by show". The Used also charted at number 34 in Australia and number 87 in Germany. It was certified gold in Australia, Canada and the US. "The Taste of Ink" charted at number 19 on the Alternative Songs chart and number 52 in the UK. "Buried Myself Alive" charted at number 13 on the Alternative Songs chart. "Blue and Yellow" charted at number 23 on the Alternative Songs chart.

By July 2003, the album had sold 500,000 copies.

Track listing 
All songs written by the Used.

Additional track information
The Used recorded 14 songs during the self titled recording session. The two b-sides from the session are titled "Choke Me" and "Just a Little".  "Choke Me" was released as a hidden bonus track on the album and later on Shallow Believer and "Just a Little" was released as a bonus track in Japan only and later on Maybe Memories.

Personnel
Personnel per booklet.

The Used
 Bert McCracken – vocals
 Branden Steineckert – drums, backing vocals
 Quinn Allman – guitars, backing vocals
 Jeph Howard – bass, backing vocals

Additional musicians
 John Feldmann – backing vocals on "Bulimic" and "Greener with the Scenery"
 Carmen Daye – additional backing vocals on "Greener with the Scenery"
 Nick Ingman – string arrangements on "Poetic Tragedy", "Greener with the Scenery" and "On My Own"

Production
 John Feldmann – producer, engineer, mixing
 Mark Blewett – assistant engineer
 Donny Campion – assistant engineer
 Joe Gastwirt – mastering
 P.R. Brown – art direction, photography, design
 Gina Keeler – additional line illustrations

Charts and certifications

Weekly charts

Certifications

References 
Citations

Sources

External links

The Used at YouTube (streamed copy where licensed)

2002 debut albums
Reprise Records albums
The Used albums
Albums produced by John Feldmann
Albums recorded at Olympic Sound Studios